This is a list of ecoregions in Kiribati.

Terrestrial
 Central Polynesian tropical moist forests
 Eastern Micronesia tropical moist forests
 Western Polynesian tropical moist forests

Marine
 Eastern Indo-Pacific realm
 Marshall, Gilbert, and Ellice Islands province
 Gilbert and Ellice Islands
 Central Polynesia province
 Line Islands
 Phoenix Islands/Tokelau/Northern Cook Islands

References

Kiribati
Kiribati-related lists
 List